The Wotton Light Railway is a private   gauge light railway located near Wotton Underwood in Buckinghamshire. It is the hobby of High Court judge Sir Jeremy Sullivan. Although the line is privately owned and operated, it may be viewed at strategic points where it crosses public footpaths, and by invitation on occasional operating days.

Locomotives

Rolling stock
The railway is equipped with a small fleet of 8-seater semi-open passenger carriages. There are several freight wagons, including open wagons in which passengers are sometimes conveyed. There is an enclosed brake van, which will accommodate two members of train crew.

References

External links
Wotton Light Railway on YouTube.

15 in gauge railways in England